"Long Distance Runaround" is a song by the progressive rock group Yes first recorded for their 1971 album, Fragile. Written by lead singer Jon Anderson, the song was released as a B-side to "Roundabout", but became a surprise hit in its own right as a staple of album-oriented rock radio. On Fragile it segues into "The Fish (Schindleria Praematurus)".

Yes co-founder Jon Anderson wrote the lyrics to this song while allegedly remembering his encounters with religious hypocrisy and competition he experienced in attending church regularly as a youth in northern England. "Long time / waiting to feel the sound" was a sentiment toward wanting to see a real, compassionate, non-threatening example of godliness.

Composition and recording
The song shifts keys between A minor and B minor and is polymetric in the verses - the drums are playing in 5/8 time against the rest of the group playing in 4/4 time.

Personnel
Jon Anderson – lead and backing vocals
Steve Howe – electric guitars
Chris Squire – bass
Rick Wakeman – RMI 300B Electra-Piano and Harpsichord, grand piano
Bill Bruford – drums, percussion

Cover versions

 The Bad Plus (album: For All I Care).
 Red House Painters (albums: Songs for a Blue Guitar and the vinyl version of Ocean Beach).
 The Joggers (album: Bridging The Distance).

References

 

Yes (band) songs
1971 songs
Songs written by Jon Anderson
Song recordings produced by Eddy Offord
1972 singles
Atlantic Records singles